Hyowon High School (Hangul: 효원고등학교) is a public high school located in Suwon, South Korea.

History 
 Jan 16, 1987 - The construction of the school was allowed. (10 classes)
 Mar 1, 1988 - The school was founded and The 1st principal Cho Dong-hyun (조동현) took office.
 Feb 8, 1991 - The 1st graduation. (Boys : 446, Girls : 112)
 Mar 2, 1995 - The 3rd Yun Dae-cheol (윤대철) principal took office.
 Feb 9, 2000 - The 10th graduation. (Boys : 439, Girls : 216)
 Mar 1, 2006 - The 7th Ryu Doh-Hyung (류도형) principal took office.
 Mar 1, 2010 - The 9th Min Wung-gi (민웅기) principal took office.
 Sep 1, 2013 - The 10th Kim Jae-tak (김재탁) principal took office.
 Feb 6, 2014 - The 24th graduation. (Boys : 296, Girls : 285)
 Mar 3, 2014 - The 27th entrance ceremony. (Boys : 282, Girls : 256)

Notable alumni 
 Choi Jae-bong, a speed skater
 Hyun Hee, a épée fencer
 Oh Kyo-moon, an archer

References

External links

Official website 

High schools in South Korea
Schools in Suwon
Educational institutions established in 1988
1988 establishments in South Korea